Prasat Suor Prat is a series of twelve towers spanning north to south lining the eastern side of a royal square in Angkor Thom, near the town of Siem Reap, Cambodia. The towers are made from rugged laterite and sandstone. They are right in front of Terrace of the Elephants and Terrace of the Leper King, flanking the start of the road leading east to the Victory Gate, on either side of which they are symmetrically arranged. Their function remains unknown.

The current tower's name in Khmer means "The towers of the tightrope dancers," a romantic idea derived from the local belief that they were used to support a high wire stretched between them for acrobatics during royal festivals. This belief, however, is irrelevant. Zhou Daguan describes in his records that the towers are used to settle disputes among Angkorian people.

The temple was possibly built during the reign of Indravarman II.

Among the twelve towers, the structures identified as N1 tower and N2 antechamber were in danger of collapse and were reconstructed in 2001-2005 by JSA (Japanese Government Team for Safeguarding of Angkor) and APSARA.

Gallery

References

Angkorian sites in Siem Reap Province